Agustina Cherri (born February 15, 1983, Argentina) is one of the leading actresses in Argentina with more than 30 years of career.

Biography
Agustina Cherri grew up as a fan of Flavia Palmiero, a famous children's show host during Cherri's childhood. She had been taking dancing classes and felt someday she would become a great dancer. In 1990, Agustina heard that there was an audition for children dancers at Palmiero's Telefe television show, La Ola Esta de Fiesta. Cherri asked her mother to take her to the audition, and she was chosen for the show, making it her first show business experience.

Career
Agustina Cherri first taste of fame came after she played Camila in 1991's Grande Pa!, a show that made her popular among Argentine pre-teens. At the same time, she participated in a variation of La Ola Esta de Fiesta, Flavia Esta de Fiesta. In 1993, she played Paola in Regalo del Cielo, which was not a major hit and has been a rather forgotten program by the general public. Her fame continued growing after her first stint at Chiquititas as Milagros Urién and, in 1998, she participated in Verano del '98, she played the role of Violeta Herrera, which was replayed by the Argentine television network in 2005. In 1999, Cherri was given her first opportunity to star in a show, playing Lucia Escobar, the leading female character in Cabecita. Two important events happened in Cherri's career during 2001: She was recalled to play Milagros Urién once again in Chiquititas, and she made her feature film debut, in a movie named Rodrigo, la Pelicula. Cherri participated as Gisela Vargas in Canal 13 Mil Millones, made in 2002, and as Anita in 2003 Son amores. That same year, she modeled for a calendar published by Caras magazine. During 2004, Cherri played Shamira in another major Canal 13 hit, Los Pensionados, and as Angela Capello in Hombres de Honor. In 2006 she starred in one of the chapters of Mujeres asesinas. At the beginning of 2007 she returned to the theater starring in the play ¿Quién le teme a Virginia Woolf?. In 2007 she's starring in the soap Mujeres de Nadie. The role was originally for Marcela Klobooster, who also starred in Chiquititas, but she couldn't accept it. Mujeres de Nadie is doing well on its afternoon slot at Canal 13. That same year she appeared in Todos contra Juan where she depicted herself. In 2009 she starred alongside Carmen Vallejos and Leonor Benedetto the prestigious unitary Rosa, Violeta y Celeste in Canal7. In 2010 she returns to participate in the telenovela Todos contra Juan. After moving away from acting for almost a year and a half due to motherhood, Agustina returns to television as the protagonist of the new unit of Canal7, El paraíso alongside Alejandro Awada and Mariano Torre. The unit and the performance of Agustina received extremely favorable reviews. In 2014, she was one of the protagonists of Pol-ka's sitcom Mis amigos de siempre alongside Nicolás Cabre, Nicolás Vázquez, Emilia Attías, Gonzalo Heredia and Calu Rivero. On the screen of Telefe she starred an episode of the unit La celebración, which was recorded a year before its broadcast. In the channel encuentro she produced and narrated the cycle Historias de género. In 2016 she is co-star of the telenovela Los ricos no piden permiso, where she plays Elena. In 2017 she star in the telenovela of Telefe Fanny, la fan where she plays Fanny. She is currently working on a theatrical work directed by Guillermo Francella based on the film of Paolo Genovese "Perfectos Desconocidos" alongside Carlos Portaluppi Magela Zannota, Gonzalo Heredia, Alejandro Awada, Mercedes Funes and Peto Menahem.

.

Humanitarian Activities
Since 2004 Agustina along with the support of the Municipality Pilar founded ADA since then chaired the non-profit association. With her charity work and the galas which celebrities came, she managed to open the ADA Home, with space to 20 people. The institution had psychologists and social workers who worked with each person who entered the shelter to facilitate their conditions when entering. The home was a transit institution which aimed to devoted the victims of gender violence the desire to have a decent life and the possibility of reintegrating into society. Currently the foundation is still valid.

Personal life
From 2007 to 2014, Agustina Cherri was in a relationship with fellow Argentine actor Gastón Pauls with whom she has two children, daughter Muna, born on March 14, 2009, and Nilo, born on December 29, 2011.

Since 2014, Agustina Cherri is in a relationship with the musician Tomás Vera. On October 1, 2019, she gave birth to Alba, first daughter with her partner.

She is a vegetarian and she is a defender of animal rights.

Filmography

Television

Theater

Movies

Discography

Awards and nominations

See also
 List of Argentines

References

External links
 
 
 

1983 births
Living people
People from Vicente López Partido
Argentine television actresses
Argentine female models
Argentine female dancers
Argentine child actresses
Argentine people of Italian descent
21st-century Argentine women